The Good War is a 2002 American-Italian historical war drama film written and directed by Giorgio Serafini and starring Roy Scheider and Luca Zingaretti.

Cast
Roy Scheider as Colonel Gartner
Luca Zingaretti as Luigi Manin
Vincent Riotta as Italian POW
Sue Cremin as Betty
Charles Fathy as Luca
Robert Farrior as Lt. Donovan
Giampiero Judica as Fabio
Luciano Miele as Italo
Mario Opinato as Lieutenant Carlo Ticinà

References

External links
 
 

American drama films
Italian drama films
Films scored by Carlo Siliotto
English-language Italian films
2000s English-language films
2000s American films